Alain Boghossian (born 27 October 1970) is a French-Armenian former professional footballer who played as a midfielder. He serves as an assistant coach for the France national team.

Club career
Born in Digne-les-Bains, Alpes-de-Haute-Provence, Alain Boghossian began playing football in the reserves of Olympique de Marseille. After a sole season on Marseille in Ligue 1, Boghossian joined Ligue 2 club Istres in order to get match practice. He returned to Marseille after a season in Istres. Boghossian moved to Italy in 1994 and was brought into Serie A club S.S.C. Napoli. He played on Napoli for three years and then played on U.C. Sampdoria for a season. Boghossian became a member of Parma A.C. in 1998, where he had his most successful years of his club career. He competed alongside compatriot Lilian Thuram on Parma. Parma won the 1998–99 UEFA Europa League, defeating Marseille 3–1 in the finals. Boghossian scored one goal at the 1998–99 UEFA Cup, the third goal in a 3–1 victory over Fenerbahçe during the second leg. While Boghossian played for Parma, the club went on to win the Italian Supercup in 1999 and the Italian Cup in 1998–99 and 2001–02. He scored the second decisive goal in the 2–1 victory of Parma over Milan in the 1999 Supercoppa Italiana final. Boghossian signed a contract with La Liga club RCD Espanyol in 2002.

Due to several injuries received throughout the year, Boghossian retired as a football player at the end of the season in June 2003.

International career
Boghossian turned down offers to play for the Armenia national football team.

He became an international player for France in 1997, and won the 1998 World Cup with France. He replaced Christian Karembeu in the final against Brazil during the second half. The day before the Euro 2000 started, Boghossian was injured and was forced to miss it. He also appeared at the 2002 World Cup, and in total made 26 international appearances, scoring 2 goals.

Style of play
Boghossian was known for his exceptional stamina as a midfielder.

Managerial career
In July 2008, the French Football Federation appointed Boghossian the assistant coach of the France national team to support head coach Raymond Domenech in the UEFA Euro 2008 qualification matches. He remained in the position when Laurent Blanc became the new manager of the French team.

After the UEFA Euro 2012 and the appointment of Didier Deschamps as manager, Boghossian was not renewed his position as assistant coach. Fitness trainer Philippe Lambert and doctor Fabrice Bryant also left the staff.
 
Boghossian is part of the national technical directors of the French Football Federation. He was awarded valedictorian upon getting his DEPF (high professional trainer).

Personal life
Alain was born in Digne-les-Bains, Alpes-de-Haute-Provence to Armenian parents. In 2001, Boghossian and Youri Djorkaeff both thanked the President of the Fifth Republic Jacques Chirac for official recognition of the Armenian genocide by France.

International goals
Scores and results list France's goal tally first, score column indicates score after each Boghossian goal.

Honours
Parma
Coppa Italia: 1998–99, 2001–02
UEFA Cup: 1998–99
Supercoppa Italiana: 1999

France
FIFA World Cup: 1998

Orders
Knight of the Legion of Honour: 1998

References

External links
 
 

Living people
1970 births
Ethnic Armenian sportspeople
People from Digne-les-Bains
Sportspeople from Alpes-de-Haute-Provence
Association football midfielders
1998 FIFA World Cup players
2002 FIFA World Cup players
Chevaliers of the Légion d'honneur
FIFA World Cup-winning players
French footballers
France international footballers
French people of Armenian descent
FC Istres players
Olympique de Marseille players
Parma Calcio 1913 players
RCD Espanyol footballers
S.S.C. Napoli players
U.C. Sampdoria players
Ligue 1 players
Ligue 2 players
Serie A players
La Liga players
French expatriate footballers
Expatriate footballers in Spain
Expatriate footballers in Italy
UEFA Cup winning players
French expatriate sportspeople in Italy
French expatriate sportspeople in Spain
Footballers from Provence-Alpes-Côte d'Azur